Pondi, also known as Langam, is a Keram language spoken in Langam village of Keram Rural LLG, East Sepik Province, Papua New Guinea. The majority of Pondi speakers are ethnic-Pondis. Due to the small community in which Pondi is spoken, the language has no known dialect. The most notable language variation in Pondi is based on age as the older generations are more fluent. It is related both Ulwa and Mwaki. Pondi is endangered because of the growing use and popularity of the Tok Pisin language, which is used more by the younger generations of speakers. The language is predicted to not be spoken in the next one hundred years.  The lexicon of the Pondi language has many words that they acquired from other languages, however, it is nearly impossible to know the origins of these words.

Consonants 
Pondi contains three voiceless stops, /p/(Labial), /t/(Alveolar), /k/(Velar). Pondi also contains three Prenasalised voiced stops, /mb (mb)/(Labial), /nd (nd)/(Alveolar), /ng (ŋɡ)/(Velar). There is only one Prenasalised voiced affricate, /nj (ndʒ)/(Palatal). Pondicontains three Nasals, /m/(Labial), /n/(Alveolar), /ny (ɲ)/(Velar). Pondi only contains one Liquid, /l/(Alveolar). Pondi has one Fricative, /s/(Alveolar). Finally, there are two Glides, /w/(Labial) and /y (j)/(Palatal).

Vowels 
Pondi contains three high vowels which are: /i/ (Front), /ï/ (Back), which is also denoted by /ɨ/, and /u/ (Central). The language has two mid vowels which are: /e/ (Front) and /o/ (Central). Finally, Pondi has only one low vowel, which is: /a/ (Back).

References

Languages of East Sepik Province
Mongol–Langam languages